Events from the year 1955 in Pakistan.
viva cr

Incumbents

Federal government
 Governor-General: Malik Ghulam Muhammad (until 7 August), Iskander Mirza (starting 6 October)
 Prime Minister: Muhammad Ali Bogra (until 12 August), Chaudhry Muhammad Ali (starting 12 August)
 Chief Justice: Muhammad Munir

Governors
 Governor of Northwest Frontier: Qurban Ali Shah (until 14 October), vacant thereafter
 Governor of West Punjab: Mushtaq Ahmed Gurmani (until 14 October), vacant thereafter
 Governor of Sindh: Iftikhar Hussain Khan Mamdot (until 14 October), vacant thereafter

Events
 September 23 – "Baghdad Pact": Military treaty among Iraq, Turkey, the U.K., Pakistan, and Iran is ratified by Pakistan.

Births
 July 22 – Asif Ali Zardari, politician

References

See also
 1954 in Pakistan
 1956 in Pakistan
 List of Pakistani films of 1955
 Timeline of Pakistani history

 
1955 in Asia